34th NSFC Awards
January 8, 2000

Best Film (tie): 
 Being John Malkovich andTopsy-Turvy
The 34th National Society of Film Critics Awards, given on 8 January 2000, honored the best filmmaking of 1999.

Winners

Best Picture 
1. Being John Malkovich
1. Topsy-Turvy
3. Election

Best Director 
1. Mike Leigh – Topsy-Turvy
2. David O. Russell – Three Kings
3. Sam Mendes – American Beauty

Best Actor 
1. Russell Crowe – The Insider
2. Jim Broadbent – Topsy-Turvy
3. Kevin Spacey – American Beauty

Best Actress 
1. Reese Witherspoon – Election
2. Hilary Swank – Boys Don't Cry
3. Kate Winslet – Holy Smoke

 Best Supporting Actor 
1. Christopher Plummer – The Insider2. Philip Seymour Hoffman – Magnolia and The Talented Mr. Ripley
3. Haley Joel Osment – The Sixth Sense

 Best Supporting Actress 
1. Chloë Sevigny – Boys Don't Cry2. Julianne Moore – Magnolia, Cookie's Fortune, A Map of the World and An Ideal Husband
3. Samantha Morton – Sweet and Lowdown

 Best Screenplay 
1. Charlie Kaufman – Being John Malkovich2. Alexander Payne and Jim Taylor – Election
3. Alan Ball – American Beauty

 Best Cinematography 
1. Conrad L. Hall – American Beauty2. Emmanuel Lubezki – Sleepy Hollow
3. Freddie Francis – The Straight Story

 Best Foreign Language Film 
1. Autumn Tale (Conte d'automne)
2. The Dreamlife of Angels (La vie rêvée des anges)
3. All About My Mother (Todo sobre mi madre)

 Best Non-Fiction Film 
1. Buena Vista Social Club'2. Mr. Death: The Rise and Fall of Fred A. Leuchter, Jr.3. American Movie Experimental Film Award 
Robert Beavers

 Special Citation 
James Quandt of Cinematheque Ontario

 Film Heritage Awards 
The U.S. theatrical release of the rediscovered camera-negative print of Jean Renoir’s Grand Illusion by Rialto Pictures.
The newly preserved fiftieth-anniversary re-release of Carol Reed’s The Third Man by Rialto Pictures.
The U.S. video and DVD release of Gaumont’s original version of Carl Dreyer’s The Passion of Joan of Arc by Home Vision and Criterion.
The television premiere of the four-hour expanded version of Erich von Stroheim’s Greed'' on Turner Classic Movies.

References

External links
Past Awards

1999 film awards
1999
2000 in American cinema